The Mespeatches were one of 13 Native American tribes who lived on Long Island, New York at the time of European contact.

The town of Maspeth, New York was named for the tribe. Their name "Mespeatches" translates as "at the bad waterplace," in reference to the swamps that once were common in the area.

The former Mespeatche village is located on the high ground east of the Mount Zion Cemetery in Maspeth.

Notes

Indigenous peoples of the Northeastern Woodlands
Native American tribes in New York (state)